The Good Life is a  play by Jeremy Sams based on the BBC sitcom of the same name written by Bob Larbey and John Esmonde.

Production 
The play is due to open at the Theatre Royal, Bath from 7 October 2021 before embarking on a UK tour until December. It will be directed by Sams and star Rufus Hound as Tom Good, Preeya Kalidas as Margo Leadbetter, Dominic Rowan as Jerry Leadbetter and Sally Tatum as Barbara Good.

Cast

References

External links 
 

2021 plays
Plays based on television series
British plays